Kim Woo-Choong (December 19, 1936 – December 9, 2019) was a South Korean businessman who was the founder and chairman of Daewoo Group until its collapse in 1999.

Background
Born in Daegu, he was the son of the provincial governor. He was a newspaper delivery boy when he was a youngster, helping a family that depended almost solely on him during a brief period. He graduated from the prestigious Kyunggi High School, then finished with an Economics Degree at Yonsei University in Seoul. His father was the teacher or mentor of future  President, Park Chung Hee, who in turn supported Kim to a great degree both financially and business-wise.

Daewoo
After graduating from Yonsei, he entered a small trading corporation specializing in textiles and clothing. He left and created Daewoo Industries with five other associates. Using his connections in the alumni of the Yonsei and with political backing, he managed to do well, and consecutively bought many different companies. Daewoo Group was originally built on companies that were bought, often distressed companies. Kim was successful in transforming near-bankrupt companies into successful enterprises. By the 1990s, with a history of some 30 years, Daewoo Group was listed as second in assets and third in revenues in Korea. This rapid growth was remarkable in comparison to how the other two of the Big 3 Korean companies, (Hyundai, LG, Samsung), made their mark.

However, due to its rather hollow financial structure, even though it had the most overseas branch offices, when the Asian Financial Crisis hit in 1997, the unstable Daewoo Group plummeted. It had to sell off nearly 50 division corporations, only focusing on the major companies.

Kim was on the list of Interpol when he was in exile, partly because of how he left Daewoo with the insurmountable debt, to his employees.

He was arrested soon after he returned to South Korea on June 14, 2005, and apologized "for hurting the nation" and accepted full responsibility for the collapse of the group, adding that he was "ready to accept whatever the authorities have in store for him," according to the Chosun Ilbo.

Criminal charges
In May 2006 he was sentenced to 10 years in jail after being found guilty of charges including embezzlement and accounting fraud. 21 trillion won ($22bn USD) of his fortune was seized and he was fined an additional 10 million won (about $10,000 USD).

Citing health concerns, his sentence was reduced to 8 and 1/2 years; then on 30 December 2007, he was pardoned by President Roh Moo-hyun. South Korean presidents traditionally hand out pardons for the new year.

Death
On December 9, 2019, Kim died due to pneumonia at Ajou University Hospital in Suwon, 10 days before his 83rd birthday.

See also
 Economy of South Korea
 List of Koreans

References

1936 births
2019 deaths
People from Daegu
20th-century South Korean businesspeople
Yonsei University alumni
South Korean Roman Catholics
South Korean founders of automobile manufacturers
Recipients of the Legion of Honour
South Korean fraudsters
Recipients of South Korean presidential pardons
South Korean football executives
South Korean football chairmen and investors
Gwangsan Kim clan
People convicted of embezzlement